Buba Yohanna  (born 12 June 1982, in Balong) is a Cameroonian professional footballer.

Club career
Buba has played for several clubs in Europe, including Altay S.K. in the Turkish Super Lig and S.C. Beira-Mar in the Portuguese Liga. He also played for Clube Recreativo da Caála in the Angolan league.

References

External links
Profile at Foradejogo.net

1982 births
Living people
Cameroonian footballers
Primeira Liga players
Süper Lig players
Canon Yaoundé players
S.C. Beira-Mar players
Altay S.K. footballers
G.D. Estoril Praia players
Gondomar S.C. players
Cameroonian expatriate footballers
Cameroonian expatriate sportspeople in Turkey
Expatriate footballers in Angola
Cameroonian expatriate sportspeople in Portugal
Expatriate footballers in Turkey
Expatriate footballers in Portugal
Association football defenders